PP-51 Wazirabad-I is a Constituency of Provincial Assembly of Punjab.

General elections 1997

General elections 2008

See also
 PP-50 Narowal-V
 PP-52 Wazirabad-II

References

External links
 Election commission Pakistan's official website
 Awazoday.com check result
 Official Website of Government of Punjab

Constituencies of Punjab, Pakistan